Marianne Cornier-Quiquandon is a French metallurgist for the French National Centre for Scientific Research (CNRS), and a member of the structural metallurgy team in the Institut de Recherche de Chimie Paris (IRCP), a joint research institute of CNRS and Chimie ParisTech. Her research involves the study of quasicrystals in aluminum alloys, with her husband Denis Gratias.

Quiquandon earned a master's degree in 1981 at Pierre and Marie Curie University, and began work at CNRS with Michel Fayard in the Centre d'Étude de Chimie Métallurgique de Vitry-sur-Seine. She completed a Ph.D. in 1988.

References

External links

Year of birth missing (living people)
Living people
French metallurgists
French women chemists